Královské Poříčí is a municipality and village in Sokolov District in the Karlovy Vary Region of the Czech Republic. It has about 800 inhabitants. It lies on the river Ohře. The centre is well preserved and is protected by law as village monument zone.

Administrative parts
The area of the former village of Jehličná is an administrative part of Královské Poříčí.

History
The first written mention of Královské Poříčí is from 1240.

References

Villages in Sokolov District